In Paradisum is a French independent record label based in Paris, France. It was founded by Guillaume Heuguet and Paul Régimbeau in 2011.

The catalog currently contains more than twenty records, regrouping various musical approaches (techno, experimental music, noise, ambient, drone, electronica).

Biography
Initially, the record label used to throw techno parties and release maxis. It progressively took harder-to-define electronic directions, mostly exploring the album format. Recently, In Paradisum launched the IPX series (explorations around the live inspiration when it comes to studio-producing) and the « Spero Lucem » concerts (inspired by the spiritual concerts of the 16th century).

Discography

Albums
 2016 : Qoso - Printemps-Eté
 2016 : Mondkopf - The Last Tales
 2015 : Run Dust - Supermarché
 2015 : Low Jack - Sewing Machine
 2015 : Run Dust - Serf Rash
 2014 : Extreme Precautions - I
 2014 : Insiden - Above Us
 2014 : Mondkopf - Hadès
 2013 : Somaticae - Catharsis

Singles and maxis
 2016 : Roger West - En Asie
 2016 : December Kaumwald - Half Cuts 1
 2015 : Sleaze Art - IPX03 - Infra-blast
 2015 : Mätisse - IPX02 - Kairos
 2015 : Somaticae - IPX01 - Electricité
 2015 : Roger West - Wasted House
 2014 : Somaticae - Pacurgis
 2014 : Qoso - Jura
 2013 : Low Jack - Flashes
 2013 : Somaticae - Pointless
 2013 : Qoso - Monica
 2013 : Insiden & Saåad - Split
 2013 : Low Jack & Qoso - Like It Soft 
 2012 : Mondkopf - Ease Your Pain Remixes 
 2012 : Ricardo Tobar - Esoteric/Carnaval 
 2012 : Somaticae - Dressed Like A Bubblegum 
 2012 : Mondkopf - Ease Your Pain

References

External links

2011 establishments in France
French independent record labels